Real Fine Place is the fifth studio album by American country music artist Sara Evans. It was released in October 2005 via RCA Records Nashville. It is the follow-up album to the platinum Restless. It features Evans's fourth number one hit "A Real Fine Place to Start", the Top 10 hit "Cheatin'", the Top 20 hit "You'll Always Be My Baby", and the Top 40 hit "Coalmine". The album debuted at number 3 on the US Billboard 200 chart, selling 124,720 copies in its first week. The album was certified platinum by the Recording Industry Association of America (RIAA) for U.S. shipments of a million copies.

Content
The track "A Real Fine Place to Start" was co-written by Radney Foster, who previously recorded it for his 2002 album Another Way to Go. Evans's rendition of the song was released as this album's first single and became her fourth number one hit on the US Billboard Hot Country Songs chart in mid-2005. Also released as singles from this album were "Cheatin'", "Coalmine", and "You'll Always Be My Baby", which respectively reached numbers 9, 37, and 13 on the country charts. "Missing Missouri" also reached number 52 based on unsolicited airplay. Several members of Evans's family sing backing vocals: her mother and father, Patricia Boggs, and Jack Evans; her brother, Matt Evans, who also serves as production assistant; and her sisters, Lesley Evans Lyons and Ashley Evans Simpson.

"Supernatural" was originally recorded by Susan Ashton on her 1999 album Closer.

Track listing

Personnel 
According to liner notes.

 Sara Evans – lead vocals, backing vocals
 Tim Akers – keyboards, acoustic piano, accordion, penny whistle
 Steve Nathan – keyboards, acoustic piano, Hammond organ
  Paul Franklin – keyboards, slide guitar, steel guitar
 Marcus Hummon – acoustic guitar
 Darrell Scott – acoustic guitar
 Bryan Sutton – acoustic guitar
 Biff Watson – acoustic guitar
 Tom Bukovac – electric guitars
 J.T. Corenflos – electric guitars
 Gary Morse – steel guitar
 Randy Scruggs – banjo
 Aubrey Haynie – fiddle, mandolin
 David LaBruyere – bass
 Glenn Worf – bass
 Matt Chamberlain – drums
 David Huff – drum programming
 Eric Darken – percussion, Jew's harp
 Jim Horn – baritone saxophone (12), horn arrangements (12)
 Jeff Coffin – tenor saxophone (12)
 Randy Leago – tenor saxophone (12)
 Chris Dunn – trombone (12)
 John Hinchey – trombone (12)
 Steve Herrman – trumpet (12)
 Steve Patrick – trumpet (12)
 Quentin Ware – trumpet (12)
 Chris McDonald – string arrangements and conductor
 Carl Gorodetzky – string contractor
 The Nashville String Machine – strings
 LaTara Conley – backing vocals
 Kim Fleming – backing vocals
 Vicki Hampton – backing vocals
 Wes Hightower – backing vocals
 Troy Johnson – backing vocals
 Janelle Means – backing vocals
 Desmond Pringle – backing vocals
 Kevin Whalum – backing vocals
 Matt Evans – backing vocals (1, 2, 9, 10)
 Lesley Evans Lyons – backing vocals (4, 7, 9, 10, 13)
 Ashley Evans Simpson – backing vocals (4, 7, 9, 10, 13)
 Jack Evans – backing vocals (5)
 Patricia Boggs – backing vocals (13)

Production  
 Sara Evans – producer
 Mark Bright – producer 
 Derek Bason – recording, mixing
 J.R. Rodriguez – additional recording, recording assistant, mix assistant 
 Chris Ashburn – recording assistant, mix assistant 
 Scott Kidd – recording assistant, mix assistant 
 Hank Williams – mastering at MasterMix (Nashville, Tennessee)
 Mike "Frog" Griffith – production coordinator 
 Matt Evans – production assistant
 Astrid Herbold May – art direction, design 
 S. Wade Hunt – cover design 
 Russ Harrington – photography
 Debbie Dover – hair stylist 
 Colleen Runne – make-up
 Claudia Fowler – wardrobe stylist

Chart performance

Weekly charts

Year-end charts

Singles

Certifications

References

2005 albums
Sara Evans albums
RCA Records albums
Albums produced by Mark Bright (record producer)